Reyhan-e Olya (also Romanized as Reyḩān-e ‘Olyā and Reyhan Olya; also known as Reyhān, Reyhān Bālā, and Reyḩān-e Bālā) is a village in Rostaq Rural District, in the Central District of Khomeyn County, Markazi Province, Iran. At the 2006 census, its population was 457, in 124 families.

References 

Populated places in Khomeyn County